Saint Padarn's Church, Llanberis is a parish church of the Church in Wales in Llanberis.

History

The foundation stone was laid on 3 January 1884 by Captain N.P. Stewart of Bryntirion.

The building was funded by the Assheton Smith family, which owned the rights to the slate quarried at nearby Dinorwig. It was designed by Arthur Baker of 14 Warwick Gardens, Kensington, London, a pupil of Sir George Gilbert Scott. The medieval font from St Peris was transferred here. The walls were built of local stone, with dressings of red stone from the quarries of Guest and Son, Runcorn. The construction cost was £5,455.

The building was dedicated on 24 June 1885.

Harold Hughes enlarged the church in 1914 with the addition of the Lady Chapel, on the church's north side, and the completion of the nave.

Parish

The church is in the parish of Bro Eryri, which encompasses:
Christ Church, Deiniolen
St Deiniol's Church, Llanddeiniolen
St Helen's Church, Penisarwaun
St Michael's Church, Llanrug
St Peris's Church, Nant Peris

Organ

The church contains a two manual and pedal, 7-stop pipe organ dating from 1921 by J. W. Walker & Sons Ltd. A specification can be found on the National Pipe Organ Register.

References

Grade II* listed churches in Gwynedd
Padarn
19th-century Church in Wales church buildings
Llanberis